Léonce-Eugène-Joseph Fabre des Essarts (19 March 1848 - 17 October 1917) was a French occultist, Symbolist poet, politician and theorist on Gnosticism and Esoteric Christianity.

Life
Born in Aouste-sur-Sye, he became a Fourierist and pacifist as well as secretary of Louis Andrieux under Boulangism. He was also deputy for Var as a republican-socialist, becoming friends with Victor Hugo and was crowned at the Jeux floraux in Toulouse as well as being involved in the administration of state education.

He was one of the first bishops consecrated by Jules Doinel's Gnostic Church of France, taking the name "Tau Synesius" as Bishop of Bordeaux. After Doinel broke with that church, Fabre des Essarts was elected patriarch in 1896, collaborating with his fellow Gnostic bishop Louis-Sophrone Fugairon (Tau Sophronius) to develop the Church. In 1900 he allowed Doinel to be re-admitted to the Church and re-consecrated bishop of Alet and Mirepoix under the name "Tau Jules".

In 1901 Fabre des Essarts consecrated Jean Bricaud (1881-1934) bishop of Lyon under the name "Tau Johannes", followed by twelve other Gnostic bishops between 1903 and 1910, including Léon Champrenaud / "Tau Théophane" (1870-1925) as bishop oFVersailles ; René Guénon / "Tau Palingénius" (1886-1951) as bishop of Alexandria and Patrice Genty / "Tau Basilide" (1883-1964). He also founded a synarchist Masonic lodge and contributed to the occultist review L'Initiation. He died in 1917 at Grenoble according to some sources or Versailles according to others.

Works

Author
 Humanité, Paris : A. Lemerre, 1885 
 La force, le droit et les trois chambres, Paris : E. Girand, 1885 
 Mon maître : réponse à Mme Claire Vautier, Paris : impr. A.-M. Beaudelot, 1887 
 La maison de Victor Hugo et la famille de Lusignan, Fabre des Essarts & Michelis di Rienzi, Paris : typographie A.-M. Beaudelot, 1887 
 Fabre Des Essarts. Pour lui. - Le Bouquet de la sœur, par Mathilde Fabre Des Essarts, Toulon : Impr. toulonnaise, 1894 
 L'Arbre gnostique, par Synésius, Paris : Chamuel, 1899 
 Odes phalanstériennes ; [Appendice] Victor Considérant, notes intimes, extrait du journal "la Méditerranée", 15 janvier 1894, Montreuil-sous-Bois (Seine) : au bureau de "la Rénovation, 1900 
 Les Hiérophantes, études sur les fondateurs de religions depuis la Révolution jusqu'à ce jour. 1re série... Fouché, Chaumette, Chantreau et le culte de la Raison ; Robespierre et l'Être suprême ; J.-B. Chemin, Valentin Haüy et les théophilanthropes...,Paris : Chacornac, 1905 
 Sadisme, satanisme et gnose, Paris : Bodin, 1906 
 Le Christ sauveur, drame gnostique en 3 journées, Paris : Bibliothèque Chacornac, 1907 
 Les Dessous de l'affaire Gilly-Andrieux, Paris : A. Savine, 1888

Forewords
 Les enseignements secrets de la gnose, Simon [Albert de Pouvourville] et Théophane [Léon Champrenaud] Matgioï ; [avant-propos de Jean-Pierre Laurant] ; [avant-propos de Synésius], Paris : R. Dumas, cop. 1975 
 Le procès des Trente : vu à travers la presse de l'époque telle qu'elle a été conservée par Madame Fénéon mère et annotée par Félix Fénéon à l'issue de son procès / préliminaire d'Emile de Saint-Auban ; préface de Fabre des Essarts ; Edition établie par Maurice Imbert, Paris : Histoires littéraires, impr. 2004

As translator
 Les Églogues de Virgile : interprétées en vers français, avec une étude de P. Laignel sur Virgile & la pastorale ; gravures d'après l'antique ; [épître liminaire de Maurice Croiset], Paris : Charles, 1901

References

People from Drôme
French occultists
French occult writers
French Freemasons
Gnostics
Symbolist poets
19th-century French poets
French essayists
Fourierists
19th-century French dramatists and playwrights
Latin–French translators
1848 births
1917 deaths